Statistics of the Primera División de México for the 1970–71 season.

Overview
Zacatepec was promoted to Primera División (Segunda División 1969–70 Champion)

Puebla was also promoted to Primera División (winner of promotional tournament between Unión de Curtidores, Nacional and Naucalpan) to increase the number of teams to 18.

The season was contested by 18 teams, and America won the championship.

Atlas was relegated to Segunda División.

After this season Necaxa was sold and changed its name to Atlético Español.

Cruz Azul moves to Mexico City.

Teams

Group stage

Group 1

Group 2

Results

Relegation Playoffs

Aggregate score tied so a 3rd match will be played

Pachuca won on aggregate 5-3. Atlas was relegated to Segunda Division

Final

America won on aggregate 2-0

References
Mexico - List of final tables (RSSSF)

Liga MX seasons
Mex
1970–71 in Mexican football